is a professional golf tournament that is played over Nagoya Golf Club's Wagō Course in Tōgō, Aichi, Japan. Founded in 1960, it has been an event on the Japan Golf Tour schedule since the tour's first season in 1973.

History
The Crowns was established as the Invitation by Chūbu Japan, All Japan Amateur and Professional Golf Championship (中部日本招待全日本アマ・プロゴルフ選手権) in 1960. The concept of the championship was competition among amateur and professional golf players. It has been played over the Wagō Course at Nagoya Golf Club every year except between 1962 and 1965, during which time it was held at Aichi Country Club (1962 and 1965) and Miyoshi Country Club (1963 and 1964).

From the 10th anniversary in 1969 to the 50th anniversary in 2009, the tournament's official name was "", as organizers invited international golfers. Winners during this time include major champions Peter Thomson, David Graham, Scott Simpson, Greg Norman, Seve Ballesteros, Davis Love III, Darren Clarke and Justin Rose.

The tournament record is 260 (20 under par), set by Masashi Ozaki in 1995. In 2010, Ryo Ishikawa recorded a Tour record final round of 58 (12 under par) to take the title by five strokes. From 2002 to 2019 the purse was ¥120,000,000 with ￥24,000,000 going to the winner. This was reduced to ¥100,000,000 in 2021.

Winners

Source:

Notes

References

External links
Coverage on the Japan Golf Tour's official site
The Crowns tournament's winners list 

Golf tournaments in Japan
Japan Golf Tour events
Sport in Nagoya
Recurring sporting events established in 1960
1960 establishments in Japan
Tōgō, Aichi